The Cobram Football Club, nicknamed the Tigers, is an Australian rules football and netball club based in the regional city of Cobram located in north east Victoria. Cobram teams currently compete in the Murray FNL.

History 
Formed in 1887, Cobram began in the Goulburn Valley Football Association(GVFA) in 1888. The club also had short stints in the Murray Border Football Association and Federal District Football Association.

Cobram FC also won two additional premierships in 1892 and 1893 as per a letter to the Cobram Courier by former player, Jack McNamara in 1903, who wrote that he had possession of the actual "Gedye's Victoria Hotel Cup" premiership cups.

In 1911, the GVFA's southernmost clubs voted against the entry of Cobram due to what was deemed as excessive travel. Cobram then went into recess in 1911, before returning to the GVFA in 1912.

Cobram was a founding member of the Murray Football League in 1931 and has remained in this league ever since.

In 1936 Cobram and Barooga football clubs merged and played as the Cobram Barooga United FC for a single season before the club was officially disbanded in April 1937. The two clubs then reformed as independent bodies, with Cobram re-joining the Murray FL and Barooga joining the Southern Riverina Football League in 1937.

Cobram Tigers remains as one of the stronger teams in MFL with multiple premierships in Senior and Junior years over the years.
 
The most recent premiership team was the third eighteen in 2019 (Rumbalara 5.5-35 def by Cobram 9.10-64).

Cadeyn Williams was rookie drafted to Richmond Football Club in the 2013 AFL Rookie Draft. Cadeyn played all his juniors at Cobram, Esava Ratugolea got drafted to the Geelong Football Club in the 2017 draft at pick 43, after playing thirds and seniors at Cobram.

After a promising home and away season for Cobram, the Murray Football League called time on the 2021 season in the wake of the COVID-19 pandemic, leaving a young tigers outfit hungrier than ever to bring home their first senior flag since 1998.

The 2022 season brought much promise, starting off the season with a dominate 98 point win over the Finley Football Club. The Tigers went on to win 12 straight games before being defeated in a 1 point thriller against the Nathalia Football Club. Finishing 15-3 for the home and away season, Cobram were the Minor Premiers for the 2022 season of the Murray Football League. Cobram would beat 2nd placed Mulwala by 2 goals in the first semi-final, advancing straight to the grand final. The grand final would start well for the Tigers, going into half time with the scores 4.3-27 v 1.3-9 against the Mulwala Football Club. Cobram however would eventually fall to Mulwala in a wet and muddy game that was fought until the very end. 

Cobram would find success in the 2022 season however, with the fourths taking the ultimate glory (Cobram 3.4-22 def Moama 3.1-19).

Football Leagues Timeline
Goulburn Valley Football Association
1888 to 1891
Gedye's Victoria Hotel Trophy
1892 to 1893
Murray Border Football Association
1894 to 1896 
Federal District Football Association
1897 to 1902
Cobram Football Club
1903 – Club in recess
Goulburn Valley Football Association
1904 to 1910
Cobram Football Club
1911 – Club in recess. Refused entry into the GVFA.
Goulburn Valley Football Association
1912 to 1914
Cobram Football Club
1915 to 1918 – Club in recess. World War II
Goulburn Valley Football Association
1919 to 1930
Murray Football League
1931 to present

Football Premierships
Seniors
 Gedye's Victoria Hotel Trophy (2)
 1892, 1893
 Federal District Football Association (1)
 1902
 Goulburn Valley Football Association (6)
 1907 1909, 1913 1914, 1928, 1929
 Murray Football League (12)
 1931, 1947#, 1948, 1955, 1959, 1960, 1961#, 1969, 1974, 1984#, 1995, 1998

Reserves
 Murray Valley Second Eighteen Football Association
 1935, 1936- Cobram / Barooga United FC
 Murray Football League (9)
 1960, 1968, 1976, 1977, 1984, 1988, 1992#, 1994, 1995

Thirds
 Murray Football League (10)
 1960, 1971, 1975, 1977, 1979, 1985, 1987, 1990, 1991, 1996, 2019.

Fourths
 Murray Football League (11)
 1978, 1979, 1982, 1983, 1984, 1985, 1986, 1987, 1988, 1995, 2008#, 2015#, 2016#, 2018#, 2022.

# - hash means undefeated champions

VFL / AFL Players
The following Cobram footballers have played senior VFL / AFL football or have been drafted to an AFL club. The year below indicates their debut season in VFL / AFL.

Victorian Football League
 1905 – Dave McNamara – St. Kilda
 1920 – Charlie Tuck – Richmond
 1925 – Jack Huggard – Richmond
 1926 – Stuart Russell – Essendon & Hawthorn
 1933 – Harold Dickinson – Essendon
 1945 – Jackie Huggard – Essendon & North Melbourne
 1949 – Ron Simpson – Fitzroy
 1961 – Keith Hollands – North Melbourne
 1965 – Peter Ennals – Footscray
 1974 – Jeff Cassidy – Geelong
 1979 – Greg Nichols – Geelong
 1984 – Steve Hocking – Geelong
 1987 – John Barnes – Essendon & Geelong
 1987 – Garry Hocking – Geelong

Australian Football League
 1994 – Shane Sikora – West Coast Eagles
 1999 – Robert Forster-Knight – Essendon & Port Adelaide
 2013 – Cadeyn Williams – Richmond. 2012 AFL Draft Rookie
 2017 – Esava Ratugolea – Geelong

References

External links

 
 Gameday website

Murray Football League clubs
Australian rules football clubs in Victoria (Australia)
Australian rules football clubs established in 1888
1888 establishments in Australia
Netball teams in Victoria (Australia)